Dorothy Jeanne Thompson (August 6, 1932 – April 13, 1986), better known as Dorothy Ashby, was an American jazz harpist, singer and composer. Hailed as one of the most "unjustly under loved jazz greats of the 1950s" and the "most accomplished modern jazz harpist," Ashby established the harp as an improvising jazz instrument, beyond earlier use as a novelty or background orchestral instrument, proving the harp could play bebop as adeptly as the instruments commonly associated with jazz, such as the saxophone or piano.

Ashby had to overcome many obstacles during the pursuit of her career. As an African American female musician in a male dominated industry, she was at a disadvantage. In a 1983 interview with W. Royal Stokes for his book Living the Jazz Life, she remarked of her career, "It's been maybe a triple burden in that not a lot of women are becoming known as jazz players. There is also the connection with black women. The audiences I was trying to reach were not interested in the harp, period—classical or otherwise—and they were certainly not interested in seeing a black woman playing the harp." Ashby successfully navigated these disadvantages, and subsequently aided in the expansion of who was listening to harp music and what the harp was deemed capable of producing as an instrument.

Ashby's albums were of the jazz genre, but often moved into R&B, world music, and other styles, especially her 1970 album The Rubaiyat of Dorothy Ashby, where she demonstrates her talents on another instrument, the Japanese koto, successfully integrating it into jazz.

Early life and education
Dorothy Thompson grew up in the jazz community in Detroit, where her father, Wiley Thompson, a self-taught jazz guitarist, often brought home fellow jazz musicians. Even as a young girl, she would provide support and background to their music by playing the piano.

She attended Cass Technical High School, where fellow students included such future musical talents and jazz greats as Donald Byrd, Gerald Wilson, and Kenny Burrell. While in high school she tried her hand at a number of instruments including the saxophone and string bass before, influenced by her father and piano teacher, coming upon the harp. Instructed by Velma Froude, Ashby learned the strict classical style of harp playing influenced by French harpist Carlos Salzedo.

Aged 17, Ashby continued her music studies at Wayne State University in Detroit, where she majored in piano and music education.

Career 
After she graduated, she began playing the piano in the jazz scene in Detroit, though by 1952 she had made the harp her main instrument.  At first her fellow jazz musicians were resistant to the idea of adding the harp, which they perceived as an instrument of classical music and somewhat ethereal in sound in jazz performances.  So Ashby overcame their initial resistance and built support for the harp as a jazz instrument by organizing free shows and playing at dances and weddings with her trio. She recorded with Jimmy Cobb, Ed Thigpen, Richard Davis, Frank Wess and others in the late 1950s and early 1960s. During the 1960s, she also had her own radio show in Detroit where she would occasionally perform live shows with her husband, and talk.

Ashby partially contributed to the spread of unstereotypical music education in Detroit, Michigan during 1967. Robert H. Klotman, a divisional director of music education was inspired by her and Cass Technical Highschool’s harp and vocal ensemble, placing 10 Troubadour harps in 5 inner city schools.

Ashby's trio, including her husband, John Ashby, on drums, regularly toured the country, recording albums for several record labels. She played with Louis Armstrong and Woody Herman, among others. In 1962, Ashby won Down Beat magazine's critics' and readers' awards for best jazz performers.

Her first full jazz LP, The Jazz Harpist, was recorded for Savoy in 1957, with Frank Wess on flute, Eddie Jones and Wendell Marshall on bass and Ed Thigpen on drums. The album was a mix of standards, such as “Thou Swell” and “Stella by Starlight”, and Ms. Ashby's originals. It was critically well received, but the record buying public ignored it. Her next album Hip Harp, (1958) on Prestige, was one of her best, with Wess, Dave Brubeck's bassist Gene Wright and Art Taylor on drums. In all Dorothy led ten sessions between 1957 and 1970 for Atlantic, Cadet and many other labels. She was fearless in her musical choices as she played not just bop, but soul, Brazilian, African, Middle Eastern and like her contemporary (and other great jazz harpist) Alice Coltrane, free jazz. Ms. Ashby pioneered the use of the Japanese koto in jazz on her 1970 album The Rubaiyat of Dorothy Ashby, which was somewhat maligned in its time, but has become appreciated as an iconoclastic marriage of soul, world music and free jazz.

The Ashby Players and theatre work 
Extending her range of interests and talents, she also worked with her husband in a theater company, the Ashby Players, which her husband founded in Detroit, and for which Dorothy often wrote the scores.  In the 1960s Dorothy Ashby, together with her husband, formed a theatrical group to produce plays that would be relevant to the African-American community of Detroit. This production group went by several names depending on the theater production.

They created a series of theatrical musical plays that Dorothy and John Ashby produced together as this theatrical company, the Ashby Players of Detroit. In the case of most of the plays, John Ashby wrote the scripts and Dorothy Ashby wrote the scores. Dorothy Ashby also played harp and piano on the soundtracks to all of her plays. She starred in the production of the play 3–6–9 herself. Most of the music that she wrote for these plays is available only on a handful of the reel to reel tapes that Dorothy Ashby recorded herself. Only a couple of the many songs she created for her plays later appeared on LPs that she released. Later in her career, she would make recordings and perform at concerts primarily to raise money for the Ashby Players theatrical productions.

The theatrical production group The Ashby Players not only produced black theater in Detroit and Canada but provided early theatrical and acting opportunities for black actors. Ernie Hudson (of Ghostbusters, credited as Earnest L. Hudson) was a featured actor in the Artists Productions version of the play 3–6–9. In the late 1960s, the Ashbys gave up touring and settled in California, where Dorothy broke into the studio recording system as a harpist through the help of the soul singer Bill Withers, who recommended her to Stevie Wonder. As a result, she was called upon for a number of studio sessions playing for more pop-oriented acts.

Death 
Ashby died from cancer on April 13, 1986, in Santa Monica, California.

Influence 
Her recordings have proven influential in various genres. The High Llamas recorded a song entitled "Dorothy Ashby" on their 2007 album Can Cladders.

Hip-hop artists have sampled her work often, including Jurassic 5, on their album Feedback, as well as Andre Nickatina on his song "Jungle". Bonobo included the track "Essence of Sapphire" on his mix album Late Night Tales.

In the '90s, Pete Rock, Rahzel and Ugly Duckling sampled Ashby's harp music for their own works.

In 2018, Drake included a sample of Ashby's rendition of "The Windmills of Your Mind" in his song "Final Fantasy" from the album Scorpion.

Discography

As leader
 1957: The Jazz Harpist (Regent) – with Frank Wess
 1958: Hip Harp (Prestige) – with Frank Wess
 1958: In a Minor Groove (New Jazz) – with Frank Wess
 1961: Soft Winds (Jazzland)
 1962: Dorothy Ashby (Argo)
 1965: The Fantastic Jazz Harp of Dorothy Ashby (Atlantic) 
 1968: Afro-Harping (Cadet)
 1969: Dorothy's Harp (Cadet)
 1970: The Rubaiyat of Dorothy Ashby (Cadet) 
 1984: Django/Misty (Philips)
 1984: Concierto de Aranjuez (Philips)

As sidewoman
With Bill Withers
+'Justments (Columbia, 1974)
With Bobbi Humphrey
Fancy Dancer (Blue Note, 1975)
With Minnie Riperton
Adventures in Paradise (Epic, 1975)
With Wade Marcus
Metamorphosis (ABC/Impulse!, 1976)
With Stanley Turrentine
Everybody Come On Out (Fantasy, 1976)
With Stevie Wonder
Songs in the Key of Life (Motown, 1976)
With Sonny Criss
Warm & Sonny (Impulse!, 1977)
With Gene Harris
Tone Tantrum (Blue Note, 1977)
With Freddie Hubbard
Bundle of Joy (Columbia, 1977)
With Billy Preston
Late at Night (Motown, 1979)
With Bobby Womack
The Poet (Beverly Glenn, 1981)
The Poet II (Beverly Glenn, 1984)With Osamu KitajimaThe Source'' (1984)

See also 

 Brandee Younger
 Alice Coltrane

References

External links
Dorothy Ashby (biography from SpaceAgePop.com)
Dorothy Ashby's Ashby Players Black Theater (A selection of Ashby Players flyers, programs, and posters on Flickr)
https://www.thejazzarts.org/blog/unsung-women-of-jazz-dorothy-ashby/

1932 births
1986 deaths
Jazz harpists
American jazz harpists
American jazz composers
Women jazz composers
American women jazz musicians
African-American songwriters
20th-century African-American women singers
Deaths from cancer in California
Wayne State University alumni
Koto players
Argo Records artists
Atlantic Records artists
Cadet Records artists
Prestige Records artists
Savoy Records artists
American women songwriters
Songwriters from Michigan
Singers from Detroit
20th-century American composers
Jazz musicians from Michigan
20th-century jazz composers
20th-century women composers